Pitcairnia lehmannii is a species of flowering plant in the Bromeliaceae family. This species is native to Ecuador.

References

lehmannii
Flora of Ecuador
Taxa named by John Gilbert Baker